Heiter bis Wolkig (English title: Partly Sunny) is a 2012 German comedy-drama film directed by Marco Petry and starring Max Riemelt, Elyas M'Barek, Jessica Schwarz and Anna Fischer.

Plot
Tim and his friend Can (Elyas M’Barek) go to bars and pretend that one is looking for a date for his friend, who is supposedly deathly ill, and needs one last roll in the hay. Thus Tim (Max Riemelt) meets Marie (Anna Fischer) and they fall in love. Marie must care for her older, ill sister Edda (Jessica Schwarz) who spends a lot of time in bed awaiting death. Marie still believes that Tim has fatal cancer, but Edda (who can judge from her own experience) knows that Tim is putting on an act.

Cast

Max Riemelt as Tim
Elyas M'Barek as Can
Jessica Schwarz as Edda
Anna Fischer as Marie
Dieter Tappert as Paul
Johann von Bülow as Dr. Seibold
Stephan Luca as Thomas
Johannes Kienast as Holger

References

External links
 

Films shot in Cologne
2012 films
2012 comedy-drama films
German comedy-drama films
2010s German films